Kongasseri Krishnan (1916 – 13 February 1976) was an Indian politician and leader of Communist Party of India. He represented Mannarkkad constituency in 1st KLA and 2nd KLA.

References

Communist Party of India politicians from Kerala
1916 births
1976 deaths